Walter Thomas Edwards (11 March 1923 – October 2000) was a Welsh footballer who played as a left winger in the Football League for Fulham, Southend United, Leicester City and Walsall.

Edwards joined Fulham from Workington in August 1946. He joined Southend United for £2,000 in March 1948, then moved to Leicester City in December of that year for £3,500. After a period playing in the north of England, he moved to Bath City for the 1950–51 season, joining fellow new recruits Trevor Jones, Wilson Fairweather and George Adams. He joined Walsall in May 1952, then moved to Oswestry in July 1953.

References

1923 births
2000 deaths
Footballers from Llanelli
Welsh footballers
Association football wingers
Workington A.F.C. players
Fulham F.C. players
Southend United F.C. players
Leicester City F.C. players
Bath City F.C. players
Walsall F.C. players
English Football League players